Korfball in Wales has been played since 1991 and is managed by the Welsh Korfball Association/Cymdeithas Pêl-Côrff Cymru. The association was established in 2002 and the Welsh Korfball Squad was formed in 2005. In 2007, the International Korfball Federation admitted Wales as an associate member.

Welsh clubs traditionally competed against English clubs from the South West of England and the inaugural Welsh National Korfball League was founded in 2007, though the top teams in Wales continue to participate in the English league structure. Welsh clubs also compete in the IKF Europa Cup, Welsh Championships, and BUCS Competitions. There are currently five clubs participating in league competitions.

The Welsh Korfball Squad has been successful on the international stage, appearing at their only World Championship in 2011 following the withdrawal of Hungary. Wales participated the World Championship Qualifiers in Turkey, 2022, and hosted its first official IKF event, Round 1 of the Europa Cup, in Cardiff in September 2016.

History
Korfball in Wales is currently played in Cardiff, Newport, and Swansea.

The first club in Wales was established in 1991 at Cardiff University by a group of Dutch students. Cardiff University is now one of the most established university clubs in the UK and won BUSA Gold at the BSKA National Championships in Cardiff, 2001. The following year, both the Welsh Korfball Association and Cardiff City were established by ex-Cardiff University students. In 2005, Cardiff Dragons was formed as a sister club of Cardiff City and started strongly winning divisions 1 and 2 in their first two seasons. It took a few years until further clubs arrived but in 2012 Cardiff Raptors was created by students leaving Cardiff University and in 2014 the first club outside of Cardiff, Aberystwyth University, was established, followed by Swansea University in 2017 and Newport Centurions in 2019.

From 2002 to 2007 the Welsh clubs competed in the Excalibur Korfball League (EKL) with teams from the South West of England. When this was disbanded, the Welsh Korfball League came into existence and was administered by the WKA. In 2009, the England Korfball Association (EKA) created a Regional League to promote high level competition between the areas of Wales and South West England.

There is limited youth korfball within Wales and it is mainly focused in primary schools. In 2012 the WKA organised the first Welsh Primary Schools Tournament. Korfball has been included in 5x60 events across Cardiff, including the Cardiff Games.
National Champion

By year

League competitions

During the winter season, korfball is played indoors and is formally organised by the WKA. In the summer, a social outdoor summer league takes place known as "Korf-Lite", utilising half court matches between teams of four players, instead of the standard eight.

Welsh Korfball League

The Welsh Korfball League (WKL) was formed in 2007 after the EKL was disbanded. It has been the regular competition in Wales ever since. Beginning in the 2016/17 season, higher level teams stopped competing simultaneously in both the WKL and English leagues.

By year

Western Regional League

The top Welsh teams participate in England Korfball's Western Regional League (WRL), against teams from the South and South West of England. A merger of Cardiff clubs (City, Dragons, and Raptors) competed for one year as Cardiff Celts. Currently, Cardiff City 1 & 2, and Cardiff Raptors 1 compete in the league.

Tournament events

Europa Cup
Wales' national champion is entitled to participate in the Europa Cup against other national champions from around Europe. No Welsh team has ever progressed past the first round of the competition.

Cardiff City competed in the first rounds in 2008, 2012, 2013, 2017, 2018, and 2019; Cardiff Raptors participated in the First Round in 2016, which was also the first official IKF event ever hosted in Wales.

Welsh Championship

The Welsh Championship takes the highest-ranked Welsh clubs, across all league competitions, to determine the national champion and entrant to the IKF Europa Cup.

Welsh Trophy

The Welsh Trophy is an event for clubs and teams not participating in the Welsh Championship.

BUCS competitions
Cardiff University and Swansea University compete in the BUCS National Competitions. Cardiff University has achieved success at the National Championship winning bronze in 1997 & 2015, and gold in 2001. An overhaul of the BUCS competitions introduced BUCS points for second and third tier competitions. Cardiff University's second team achieved a silver medal position at the third tier National Shield event, in 2015, with Swansea University winning Gold in 2019.

Inter-Area
Welsh regions compete in the annual EKA Inter-Area against counties in England.

Cardiff Freshers' Tournament

Cardiff University Korfball Club host the annual beginners' tournament at Talybont Sports Centre. This event is aimed primarily at other universities with requirements placed on team entries stipulating that 50% of the team must be new to the sport.

Cardiff Summer Tournament

Normally held in August, this annual outdoor event was first organised in 2006. A maiden beach korfball event took place in the summer of 2018.

Welsh clubs

Welsh korfball clubs are:
 Cardiff University (Est. 1991)
 Cardiff City (Est. 2002)
 Cardiff Dragons (2005-2015)
 Cardiff Raptors (Est. 2012)
 Cardiff Metropolitan University (2013-2020)
 Aberystwyth University (2014-2019)
 Swansea University (Est. 2017)
 Newport Centurions (Est. 2019)
 Swansea Roar (Est. 2022)

Wales national team

The Welsh Korfball Squad (WKS) was formed in 2005 and competed at their first IKF competition in 2007. In 2011, Wales competed at the IKF World Championship. In 2014, the first ever Wales U21 squad competed against England u21s and a Wales U19 squad competed in the 2018 Beach Korfball World Cup.

See also
Korfball World Championship
European Korfball Championship
Korfball European Bowl
Wales national korfball team

References

External links
  Welsh Korfball Association/Cymdeithas Pêl-Corff Cymru
  International Korfball Federation

 
Wales